The Further Adventures of Lord Quas is the second studio album by Quasimoto, a hip hop duo composed of Madlib and his animated alter ego, Lord Quas. It was released via Stones Throw Records on May 3, 2005.

Reception
At Metacritic, which assigns a weighted average score out of 100 to reviews from mainstream critics, The Further Adventures of Lord Quas received an average score of 79% based on 23 reviews, indicating "generally favorable reviews".

Jonathan Forgang of Stylus Magazine gave the album a grade of A−, saying, "The Further Adventures of Lord Quas features some of Madlib's most difficult and most accomplished production work to date."

Track listing
All tracks produced by Madlib.

Charts

References

External links
 

2005 albums
Stones Throw Records albums
Madlib albums
Albums produced by Madlib